Call Federal Credit Union is a federally insured, not-for-profit financial cooperative headquartered in Richmond, Virginia. It is regulated under the authority of the National Credit Union Administration (NCUA) of the U.S. federal government. Call Federal Credit Union is the second-largest Richmond-based credit union. As of December 31, 2018, Call Federal Credit Union had $400 million USD in assets and 33,000 members. In accordance with the Federal Credit Union Act of 1934, Call Federal Credit Union is a tax-exempt, federally chartered, federally insured, not-for-profit financial cooperative. Call Federal Credit Union accounts are insured up to $250,000 through the NCUA, which is comparable to the insurance provided to accounts at traditional banks via the Federal Deposit Insurance Corporation.

History
Call Federal Credit Union was formed in September 1962 by volunteer employees of Philip Morris USA in Richmond, Virginia. The credit union's name was derived from the company's iconic bellhop Little Johnny, who was known for the slogan "Call for Philip Morris." In the beginning, all transactions were completed by credit union volunteers.

In 1964, Alice S. Pearce, wife of founding board member William Pearce, became the credit union's first paid employee. The credit union originally operated out of donated space from Philip Morris USA. In 1979, Philip Morris USA purchased a United Virginia Bank branch on Commerce Road in Richmond, Va. In 1984, the credit union brought an ATM to the Commerce Road branch. In 1994, Call Federal Credit Union opened a branch in Mechanicsville, Virginia in Hanover County; that was replaced in 2010. A branch in Chesterfield County, Virginia, was opened in 1996. That branch closed and in 2003, Call Federal Credit Union opened what is loosely referred to as a “credit union mall”: three separate credit unions operating independently in the same building. An unprecedented concept at the time that demonstrated the innovative, cooperative nature of credit unions. A branch in Henrico County, Virginia, was opened in September 2008. In 2015, Call Federal opened its 5th branch, the second in Chesterfield, in the Hancock Village Shopping Center. Befitting its location in a popular shopping area, the Hancock Village branch represents a shift from the traditional teller line setup and features a more open, comfortable retail environment. A third Chesterfield location and the sixth overall branch opened in February 2018 on Iron Bridge Rd in the Chester section of the county, sharing the retail style of the Hancock Village branch, in a smaller footprint. As of February 2020, the former RiverTrace Federal Credit Union on Staples Mill Rd in Henrico County pushed the number of Call Federal branch locations to seven.

Call Federal Credit Union previously had branch operations in Louisville, Kentucky until 2005 and in Concord, North Carolina until 2012.

Membership
Membership to Call Federal Credit Union was originally limited to Philip Morris USA employees and their family members. Membership was opened up to select employee groups in the mid-1990s, and was extended to underserved areas of the city of Richmond in July 2006. Call Federal Credit Union received a community charter on July 7, 2010, that allowed it to serve anyone living and/or working in the city of Richmond as well as the counties of Henrico, Chesterfield and Hanover.

In July 2014, Call Federal received approval of its community charter expansion application by the National Credit Union Administration (NCUA) Board. The approval means that Call Federal can now serve the entire Richmond Metropolitan Statistical Area (MSA), which includes 16 counties and the cities of Richmond, Colonial Heights, Hopewell, and Petersburg. Call Federal is the second largest credit union headquartered in the Richmond area.

A $5 share savings account entitles members to one vote at the annual meeting.

Services
Checking, savings, money market, CDs, IRA savings, auto loans, personal loans, education loans, mortgage loans, home equity loans, credit cards, nationwide ATM network alliance , free online banking, free mobile banking access, debit cards and direct deposit. In 2008, Call Federal Credit Union began offering youth savings accounts for persons younger than 18. The first $1,000 deposited into these accounts earns an above-market rate of interest.

Board members
Board members serve three-year terms. They are elected at the annual meeting; there are no term limits.

Board of Directors: James C. Horne, Jr., Chairman of the Board; William D. Thomson, Vice Chairman of the Board; Julian L. White, Treasurer; Nancy L. Ross, Secretary; Michael Swink, Director; William E. Poorbaugh, Director; Mark Matthews, Director; Lauren Napolitano, Director; Jeffrey Edwards, Director; Sam Brumberg, Associate Director.

Supervisory Committee: Anita C. Dunn, Chairperson; Michael Swink; Willie M. Jefferson; Dolly Snead; Harrison Bonner III.

Mergers
Exxon Credit Union in Richmond, Va., which had roughly $100,000 in assets and 100 members, merged with Call Federal Credit Union in 2003. In July 2008, Media General's credit union, Media First in Richmond, Va., which had about 1,000 members and $3.2 million in assets, merged with Call Federal Credit Union. In February 2020, a merger was completed with RiverTrace Federal Credit Union, bringing 1,300 members and $16 million in assets to the combined organization.

Community involvement
Call Federal Credit Union offers scholarships to high school seniors annually in June through its Alice S. Pearce Scholarship fund. The fund is named after Alice S. Pearce, who was the credit union's first paid employee; in the early days of the credit union she processed many of the transactions from her dining room table. Pearce retired in 1991 as the president/CEO.

Call Federal Credit Union and its employees volunteer with the YMCA's Bright Beginnings program, which helps children from low-income families obtain school supplies; Habitat for Humanity; and Virginia Blood Services. Employees are also encouraged to get involved in community organizations such as the Central Virginia Food Bank, Children's Miracle Network and the Make-a-Wish Foundation. Credit union staff also gives financial literacy talks to members, business groups and schools.

Awards/recognition
2010 Credit Union National Association (CUNA) Marketing and Business Development Council Awards:
Diamond Award (1st Place), Direct Mail, VISA Campaign. Diamond Award (1st Place), Membership Packers, Brochures and Booklets. Empower Checking: The Switch Kit on Steroids. Merit Award, Where Principles Matter TV Commercials.

2009, Local Emmy for TV Commercial on NBC 12

2009, Interior Design Excellence Award by ASID/IIDA Virginia

2008, Kelley Parks, CUNA (Credit Union National Association) Marketer of the Year

2008, National Academy of Arts & Sciences Regional Emmy Award for I Luv Richmond television commercial

2008, Credit Union Direct Lending (CUDL) Best Practices in Marketing to Members

2008, Best Practices in Credit Union Branding

References

Credit unions based in Virginia
Banks established in 1962
1962 establishments in Virginia